Barlby is a linear village in North Yorkshire, England. Across the bypass is Barlby's smaller sister village, Osgodby with which it forms the civil parish of Barlby with Osgodby.

Geography

Seen from the air, Barlby is long and narrow. Although it is classified as a single village it consists of two distinct areas: Barlby Hilltop, at the north end of the village; and Barlby Bridge which lies slightly to the south-west. The building of new estates in recent years has blurred the division between the two.

Barlby Hilltop contains Barlby Community Primary School,  a library, a late eighteenth century church dedicated to All Saints and Barlby High School which also serves pupils from the surrounding villages of Osgodby, Riccall, Kelfield, Escrick, Cliffe, North Duffield, South Duffield, Hemingbrough and Bubwith. Despite its name Barlby Hilltop sits only slightly higher than Barlby Bridge.

Flood risk
Like other settlements in the Vale of York, the village has historically been vulnerable to flooding, and was particularly badly hit in November 2000. The main electrical substation in the area was damaged by the flood, resulting in power loss for up to two weeks. The Prince of Wales visited Barlby, Naburn and York following the flood.

The existing flood defences were improved as part of an £18 million scheme that was completed in 2008. As a result of the flood defence improvements, the Environment Agency considers the entire residential area of Barlby to be in the 0.5% (1 in 200) "low risk" category for flooding.

Transport
Barlby is served by an Arriva Yorkshire bus service, 415/416 which runs between Selby and York. The service runs through the village every 20 minutes on weekdays. In June 2013 contractors completed a new three-lane roundabout that was built on the A19 and A63 junction between Barlby and Osgodby. The roundabout was designed to slow traffic. The previous junction, constructed in 1987 was poorly set out which contributed to many traffic accidents. Since the completion of the roundabout there have been fewer accidents, traffic moves more slowly and in greater safety.

History 

The toponym is from an Old English personal name Bardolf, with the Old Danish suffix -by ("farm" or "village"), thus "Bardolf's farm". The place is mentioned in the Domesday Book.

In the Middle Ages the village was in the Ouse and Derwent wapentake of the East Riding of Yorkshire, and in the large ancient parish of Hemingbrough. The judges William and Robert de Bardelby are said to have taken their name after Barlby. It became a separate civil parish in 1866.  In 1935 the civil parish was abolished and merged with the parish of Osgodby to form the new parish of Barlby with Osgodby.

In 1974 Barlby was transferred from the East Riding to the new county of North Yorkshire.

Governance
An electoral ward in the name of Barlby exists. This ward had a population of 4,163 at the 2011 Census.

Gallery

References

External links 

Barlby and Osgodby Parish Council web site
The Ordnance Survey grid reference for Barlby Hilltop is 
The Ordnance Survey grid reference for Barlby Bridge is 

Villages in North Yorkshire
Former civil parishes in North Yorkshire
Selby District